Waynesville Main Street Historic District may refer to:

Waynesville Main Street Historic District (Waynesville, North Carolina), listed on the NRHP in North Carolina 
Waynesville Main Street Historic District (Waynesville, Ohio), listed on the NRHP in Ohio

See also
Main Street Historic District (disambiguation)